The Three Rivers Academy is an English-language high school in Trois-Rivières, Quebec, Canada. It was created from the amalgamation of St. Patrick's High School and Three Rivers High School.

Sports and traditions
Three Rivers Academy has athletic teams in basketball, flag football, ultimate frisbee, and floorball.

Annual events include a spring festival and MC/MR festivities.

Curriculum
Three Rivers Academy offers an English Secondary program in line with the Québec Educational Program with emphasis on computers, mathematics and the sciences. The school also offers as well a Sports Study Program.

Support Services
TRA has support services which include special education technicians, career advisors, homework assistance, psycho-educator, psychologist, and a nurse.

References

External links
Three Rivers Academy

English-language schools in Quebec
Schools in Trois-Rivières

fr:Commission scolaire Central Québec